Parliamentary elections were held in QwaQwa in 1985. The result was a victory for the Dikwankwetla Party.

References

1985 elections in South Africa
Elections in South African bantustans
QwaQwa